The Point Chevalier Pirates are an Auckland rugby league club based in Point Chevalier. The Pirates currently compete in the Fox Memorial (First Division) competition run by the Auckland Rugby League.

History
 

The club was founded in 1919. On April 5, 1919 the Auckland Star reported that a "new club that has just been affiliated is the Eden Ramblers, boys from Avondale and Point Chevalier". In 1911 a club named Eden Ramblers had formed in the area and played at the Avondale racecourse with the club rooms in Point Chevalier. However they ceased fielding teams during 1913 and effectively folded in the same year. The new team however was not to become known as the Eden Ramblers but in fact were named Point Chevalier rugby league club. Point Chevalier did not field any teams in 1919 and were not officially registered with the Auckland Rugby League until 1920 when they entered a side in the third grade therefore their true beginnings were more likely 1920 than 1919. Their first ever match was played at Walker Park on May 8, 1920 against Devonport United (North Shore Albions). The shore side won 22-6. 

Point Chevalier won their first ever Fox Memorial title in 1953.

In the 1980s and 1990s the club's senior team merged with the City club to form City-Point Chevalier.

2010 and beyond resurgence
In 2010 Awen Guttenbeil returned to the club as coach. Former professional players Stacey Jones, Wairangi Koopu, Monty Betham and Karl Te Nana all joined the squad for the club's 90th year as the team easily won the Phelan Shield.

This began a rapid rise for the club as they won the Sharman Cup (second division) the following year, gaining promotion to the Fox Memorial for 2012. The Pirates finished the season third, but in their final match against the Marist Saints, the Pirates fielded a third-string side and were beaten 102–0, and denied Papakura, who had beaten the Pirates on both occasions the teams had met earlier in the year, a place in the semi-finals to play the Pirates again the following week. Papakura appealed to the Auckland Rugby League, and the Pirates were found guilty of bringing discredit on the game and were ejected from the play-offs.

The Pirates came back stronger the following year and won the Fox Memorial in 2013, 2014 & 2015. Only 3 other clubs have won 3 in a row in the history of the 1st grade competition. They won the Fox Memorial again in 2018. They failed to make the final in 2019 and then the 2020 and 2021 seasons were cancelled due to covid. They had been in second position after 8 rounds in 2020 when the season was cancelled. Then in 2021 they had progressed unbeaten through the qualifying competition with 11 wins and were unbeaten through the Fox Premiership games with another 7 wins however the season was once again cancelled prior to their semi final with Glenora. In 2022 a shortened competition was run and Point Chevalier won their 6th title with a 14-12 win over recent rivals Glenora Bears.

Notable players
Notable players to play for the club include Great Britain representative Karl Harrison and Samoan international Hutch Maiava. Arden McCarthy,

Players to play for the New Zealand national rugby league team include Doug Anderson, Vic Belsham, Shane Varley, Jack Russell-Green, Bill Schultz, Paul Schultz, Bob McGuinn, Henry Maxwell, Duncan MacRae, Ken Stirling, Gordon Moncur, Graham Mattson, Dennis Key, John Sparnon, Awen Guttenbeil, Stacey Jones Fuifui Moimoi, Tawhiao Rogers, Henry Paul, Evarn Tuimavave Tevita Latu, Wairangi Koopu, Paki Afu,

The club has also produced three test referees:  Vic Belsham, John Percival and Ray Shrimpton.

Point Chevalier Senior Team Records (1920-1944 + 2020-2022)
The season record for the most senior men’s team in the club.

References

External links
Official ARL Site
Field of dreams By Alan Perrott, Aug 23, 2010 New Zealand Herald

 
Rugby clubs established in 1919